The 2022–23 season is the Bangladesh Police Football Club's 51st season since its establishment in 1972 and their 4th season in the top flight, Bangladesh Premier League. In addition to domestic league, Bangladesh Police FC will participate on this season's edition of Federation Cup and Independence Cup. The season covering period from 8 October 2022 to TBC 2023.

Current squad
Bangladesh Police FC squad for 2022–23 season.

Pre-season friendly

Transfer

In

Out

Competitions

Overall

Overview

Premier League

League table

Results summary

Results by round

Matches

Federation Cup

Group stages

Super Cup

Qualifying round

Independence Cup

Group stages

Knockout stages

Statistics

Goalscorers

Source: Matches

References

2022 in Bangladeshi football
2023 in Bangladeshi football
Bangladeshi football club records and statistics
Football clubs in Bangladesh